One of the competitions in equestrian at the 1924 Summer Olympics was the individual eventing. The rules only allowed military officers to join the competition. From the results of the individual eventing, a team event was compiled.

Individual event
The individual eventing was divided into three parts: dressage (10% of the total score), field (70%) and jumping (20%). The field was again divided into public road, steeple chase (4 km) and cross country (8 km).

In the first event, dressage, the Dutch riders were the best, and they took the top four spots. Colenbrander ranked first, followed by Adolph van der Voort van Zijp.

The field competition was chaotic. After the race, the Dutch team saw that Van der Voort van Zijp was ranked 27th, and they complained. The organisation then discovered that they had mixed up the scores, and that Van der Voort van Zijp had actually finished second in the field competition. In the overall competition, he was now leading.

In the jumping competition, Van der Voort van Zijp made no mistakes, so he kept the first position and won the event.

Results

References

Sources
 

Eventing